Joseph Edidiong (born 24 September 2002) is a Nigerian weightlifter. He participated at the 2022 Commonwealth Games in the weightlifting competition, being awarded the bronze medal in the men's 67 kg event.

Edidiong previously participated at the 2021 Commonwealth Weightlifting Championships, being awarded the silver medal in the men's 67 kg event. He was the second person to win a medal for his country at the 2022 Commonwealth Games.

References 

2002 births
Living people
Place of birth missing (living people)
Nigerian male weightlifters
Weightlifters at the 2022 Commonwealth Games
Commonwealth Games bronze medallists for Nigeria
21st-century Nigerian people
Commonwealth Games medallists in weightlifting
Medallists at the 2022 Commonwealth Games